Roberto Marson (29 June 1944 – 7 November 2011) was an Italian multisport athlete who competed at the Summer Paralympics on four occasions and won a total of 26 Paralympic medals. He lost the use of his legs when a pine tree he was chopping down fell on his back.

He is included in Visa Paralympic Hall of Fame of the International Paralympic Committee.

Biography
Marson made his first Paralympic appearance, representing Italy, in the second ever Games  in Tokyo, Japan, in 1964. He competed in three different sports: athletics, wheelchair fencing and swimming. In athletics he won two gold medals and two silver medals, setting a new world record of 24.20 metres in the men's javelin C classification. He finished fourth in both of the freestyle swimming events in which he competed. In the individual fencing events Marson won silver in épée and sabre, but alongside compatriots Franco Rossi and Rengo Rogo he won a team épée gold medal and a team sabre bronze medal.

At the 1968 Summer Paralympics held in Tel Aviv, Israel, Marson was proclaimed the outstanding athlete of the Games after winning ten gold medals; three in athletics field events, three in swimming and four in wheelchair fencing. His swimming golds all came on the same day as he won the 50 metres events for freestyle, breaststroke and backstroke. In wheelchair fencing he won individual gold for épée, foil and sabre. He was joined by Giovanni Ferraris, Vittorio Loi, Franco Rossi and Germano Zanarotto to defeat France 5–4 in the final and win gold for Italy in the team foil. With Ferraris and Zanarotto he won a silver in team sabre and also won silver in the team épée alongside Loi and Rossi. He successfully defended the Paralympic javelin and discus titles that he had won in Tokyo and added a third athletics gold medal in the club throw and a bronze in the shot put.

In 1972 at the Paralympics in Heidelberg, Marson contested a single athletics event and four wheelchair fencing events. He finished fourth in the men's discus 4 event with the gold being won by Canadian Eugene Reimer. In the individual épée, individual sabre and team épée events he retained his Paralympic titles, but his Italian team was beaten to the gold medal in the team sabre by Great Britain.

Marson's final Paralympic Games came in 1976 in Toronto, Canada. He failed to win medals in either of his athletic events or the individual wheelchair fencing events, but did take a bronze medal in the men's team épée. He was President of Federazione Italiana Sport Handicappati from 1980 until 1990. He died in 2011 and in 2012 he was inducted into the International Paralympian Hall of Fame.

See also
 List of multiple Paralympic gold medalists
 List of multiple Paralympic gold medalists at a single Games
 IPC inducts new members into its Hall of Fame
 Italy at the Paralympics - Multiple medallists

References

External links
 
 Roberto Marson  at Memoria paralimpica
 Il pioniere primo italiano nella Hall of Fame 

Italian male swimmers
Italian male table tennis players
Paralympic swimmers of Italy
Paralympic athletes of Italy
Swimmers at the 1964 Summer Paralympics
Swimmers at the 1968 Summer Paralympics
Athletes (track and field) at the 1964 Summer Paralympics
Athletes (track and field) at the 1968 Summer Paralympics
Athletes (track and field) at the 1972 Summer Paralympics
Athletes (track and field) at the 1976 Summer Paralympics
Paralympic gold medalists for Italy
Paralympic silver medalists for Italy
Paralympic bronze medalists for Italy
Wheelchair category Paralympic competitors
Paralympic wheelchair fencers of Italy
Wheelchair fencers at the 1964 Summer Paralympics
Wheelchair fencers at the 1968 Summer Paralympics
Wheelchair fencers at the 1972 Summer Paralympics
Wheelchair fencers at the 1976 Summer Paralympics
2011 deaths
1944 births
Medalists at the 1964 Summer Paralympics
Medalists at the 1968 Summer Paralympics
Medalists at the 1972 Summer Paralympics
Medalists at the 1976 Summer Paralympics
Italian male fencers
Paralympic medalists in athletics (track and field)
Paralympic medalists in swimming
Paralympic medalists in wheelchair fencing